The Unicode block Playing Cards contains a full 56-card deck,  a backside, three jokers, and 21 trump card images.

Chart

Emoji
The Playing Cards block contains one emoji:
.

History
The following Unicode-related documents record the purpose and process of defining specific characters in the Playing Cards block:

References

Unicode blocks